Klosterneuburg Dukes is an Austrian professional basketball club based in Klosterneuburg. With a total of 10 national titles, Klosterneuburg is one of the most successful teams in Austria.

History
In 1952, the team was founded as a part of the association football team Klosterneuburg SV. After numerous mergers the team eventually was named Klosterneuburg BC and in 1970, it promoted to the ÖBL, the Austrian First Division. 

The 80s were the golden years for the club. They won their first national title in 1978 and from 1983 till 1990 they won the ÖBL 8 times in a row. 

In 2012, they were the second team in Austrian basketball history to win the "Title Triple"; they took all the three major trophies (League, Cup and Supercup) that year.

Honours
Austrian Championship (10x) 
1978, 1983, 1984, 1985, 1986, 1987, 1988, 1989, 1990, 2012 

Austrian Cup (1x) 
2013 

Austrian Supercup (2x) 
2012, 2013

Season by season

Notable players

 Moritz Lanegger (2011–present)

External links
Eurobasket.com Klosterneuburg Dukes Page

Basketball teams in Austria
Basketball teams established in 1952